James Baron (born 1973) is an American football player

James Baron may also refer to:

Jim Baron (born 1954), American college basketball coach
Jimmy Baron (born 1961), American radio disc jockey
Jimmy Baron (basketball) (born 1986), American basketball player
James N. Baron, American sociologist

See also
James Barron (disambiguation)
James Barroun (died 1569), Scottish merchant